"The New Year's Sacrifice" (祝福) is a short story of 1924 by Chinese author Lu Xun.

It is a story of a woman who is exposed to a sad life that eventually forces her to the external scopes of societal moral standards. The story is a way for motivating social changes. It has distinctive consideration to women's dilemma by taking into account women's liberty concepts. The story, which occurred during the early era of the 1911 revolution, is a religious ceremony that occurs on the impressionable New Year's Day in China. 

Xun was an educated person who sought change in the Chinese culture through his writing. His goal was to illustrate the prejudiced treatment of women in Chinese society.

Protagonist 
The protagonist of the story is Xiang Lin's wife, a widow who has been used by the author to depict a country against which women who possess a low social position are prejudiced against. The wife of Xiang Lin is driven crazy by the forces of primitive marriage, her villagers' naivety, and religion. Additionally, the woman struggles with loneliness and depression on account for how the Chinese community perceived her as a widow. All throughout the story, she seeks blessings from her neighbors and the family that employed her as a maidservant. Members of society look at her as being beneath them. The story explores the themes of marriage tradition, the rights of women, superstition, and religion.

Plot 
"The New Year's Sacrifice" is about the life of a 25-year-old widowed woman who works as a house servant after her husband has died. She works hard and thrives in her current home specifically at the time of the sacrifice. However, on one fateful day, her ex-mother-in-law orchestrates her kidnapping, and she is returned to the village she came from, which is located in the mountains. Her family takes away her earnings and she is forced to marry a man from a rural region. However, she fights against the marriage, as she is accustomed to life in an educated household. She swears, curses, and hits her head on the altar.

Eventually, she surrenders and one year later she appears satisfied with her new son. Later, she goes back to the house of the educated man after the death of her son and husband. Since she is considered unlucky, she is faced with apprehension and forbidden from touching the sacrifice regalia due to the fear of aggravating ancestors. This stigmatization causes her to be distressed and she faces ridicule for allowing her son to die. Later, someone informs her that she will face punishment in the afterlife as her deceased husbands will tear her apart by fighting for her.

People stipulate that marrying more than once is a crime and that the only way of atoning for this crime is by contributing money to the threshold of the temple. To avoid the punishment, she complies and donates all her savings to meet the threshold. However, despite her effort to make amends for her sins, she still faces discrimination. She is prevented from participating in the sacrifice ceremony and becomes upset, believing that she was purified. She is finally let go and becomes a beggar and on New Year's Sacrifice's eve, she is killed by an explosion of firecrackers.

Themes 
The New Year's Sacrifice story chronicles the distressing story of a woman who deals with difficult circumstances in her life and illustrates how it impacts her all through her ensuing years. The harrowing events that occurred earlier in her life and the profane comments from the individuals in her society caused her to be fearful of what would occur when she died.

Marginalization 
The story indicts mainstream Chinese beliefs at the time. Xiang Lin's wife is marginalized by society. Initially, she loses her husband and has to escape from the rest of her kin. Being a widow, she is considered a secondary citizen in the eyes of the members of her community. Although she is determined to have a simple and quiet life, the family she escapes from kidnaps her and forces her to remarry. Since the second marriage challenges her religious ideals, she desperately fights to escape it.

Double Standards for Women in Traditional Chinese Beliefs 
Through the character of Xiang Lin's wife, Lu Xun highlights the issues in belief and manages to convey them through the story in a manner that motivates readers to question the beliefs. In constantly showing the woman experiencing dreadful life-changing experiences and illustrating how the people who are supposed to take care of her do not sympathize with her situation, he illustrates the flawed beliefs to the public. Ultimately, forced into compliance she gets married, and she becomes physically and mentally hurt in through story. Eventually, she adapts to her new life, and even though it is implied that she is not as happy and bright as she used to be, she is once again fulfilled in life. Once more, she is tested when her son is killed by a wolf and her second husband passes away. She goes back to the town where she previously worked, crushed without her previous spirit and is treated as an outcast. The resulting incidents make her question her religious ideals and in this case, Lu Xun manages to illustrate the double standards in the Chinese beliefs regarding women. The story digs into major details depicting the mainstream views and the way they can be employed to harm society and restrict people's minds.

Film adaptation 
In 1956, the story was adapted into a film of a similar name by the Beijing Studio. The film maintains the story's dignified and severe style and grim mood. It focuses on the depiction of characters through facial expressions and body movements, as well as skillfully unveiling the temperaments of the characters by portraying the characters' visual imagery. The film has elements that are not present in the original story. For example, a scene where Mrs. Xiang Lin hacks at the temple threshold is not in the original story. In 1958, the film received the Silver Cap Prize at Mexico International Film Festival.

References 

1924 short stories
Short stories set in China
Short stories by Lu Xun
Short stories adapted into films